Helen Betty Osborne, or Betty Osborne (July 16, 1952 – November 13, 1971), was a Cree Aboriginal woman from Norway House reserve who was kidnapped and murdered while walking down Third Street in The Pas, Manitoba.

Life 
Osborne was born in Norway House, Manitoba, the eldest of 12 children born to Joe and Justine (née McKay) Osborne. Her ambition was to go to college and become a teacher. There was no secondary school in Norway House, so she had to leave home for further education. She spent two years at Guy Hill Residential School, just outside The Pas, Manitoba, a culturally mixed town of European Canadians, Métis and Cree people. In the fall of 1971, Osborne attended Margaret Barbour Collegiate in The Pas, boarding with a non-aboriginal family.

On the evening of her death, Osborne had spent time with friends at The Northern Lite Cafe and then at the Bensons' place (where she was staying) before heading back downtown. Around midnight, Osborne's friends returned home; very little is known of Osborne's whereabouts or actions after this time. She was walking home at approximately 2:30 a.m. when she was abducted, repeatedly raped, brutally beaten, stabbed with a screwdriver over 50 times, and killed. The following day, Kenny Gurba, a fourteen-year-old in the town, grew tired of fishing and went off looking for rabbit tracks when he discovered her unclothed body. He and his father reported the discovery to the police.

Murder investigation 
Police at first suspected her ex-boyfriend, Cornelius Bighetty. His name was cleared after successfully passing a lie detector test. She and Cornelius had an argument earlier in the evening at the Cambrian Hotel. During the initial days of the investigation, attention was placed on Betty's friends. Unfortunately, unacceptable recording and preserving of evidence at the Pump House (the crime scene) seriously crippled the investigation.

Dwayne Archie Johnston, James Robert Paul Houghton, Lee Scott Colgan and Norman Bernard Manger, four young, Caucasian men from The Pas, were eventually implicated in her death. However, it was not until December 1987, sixteen years after her death, that any of them were convicted of the crime. It was at this time that Constable Rob Urbanowski took over the investigation and placed an ad in the local newspaper asking for witnesses to come forward. Even then, only Johnston was convicted, as Houghton had been acquitted, Colgan had received immunity for testifying against Houghton and Johnston, and Manger was never charged.

The Aboriginal Justice Implementation Commission conducted an investigation into concerns surrounding the length of time involved in resolving the case. According to the Commission report, Osborne's autopsy showed that "along with well over 50 stab wounds, her skull, cheekbones and palate were broken, her lungs were damaged, and one kidney was torn. Her body showed extensive bruising." The Commission concluded that the most significant factors prolonging the case were racism, sexism and indifference of white people.
The Royal Canadian Mounted Police officially closed the Osborne case on February 12, 1999.

Aftermath 
A formal apology from the Manitoba government was issued by Gord Mackintosh, Manitoba's Minister of Justice, on July 14, 2000. The apology addressed the failure of the province's justice system in Osborne's case. The province created a scholarship in Osborne's name for Aboriginal women.

The small town of The Pas, Manitoba, is still affected by this event.

As a way to remember Helen Betty Osborne, the town of Norway House named the school after her. The University of Winnipeg's Wii Chiiwaakanak Learning Centre is located in a building named after Osborne. 

On March 26, 2008, the Osborne family again grieved as her brother was found slain in his apartment in downtown Winnipeg. It was Winnipeg's sixth homicide of 2008.

Cultural references
On December 2, 2008, a graphic novel entitled The Life of Helen Betty Osborne was launched by The Helen Betty Osborne Memorial Foundation. The purpose of the graphic novel was to educate youth about racism, sexism, and indifference.

Canadian Indie-Folk Rock band The Wooden Sky has produced a four-song EP entitled "The Lonesome Death of Helen Betty Osborne" and has also released a song with the same title on their full-length album When Lost At Sea in recognition of Osborne. Lyrics to the song depict the night of Osborne's murder.

Robert Munsch, a renowned Canadian author of children's books, discussed his experience of being walked to the grave of Helen Betty Osborne one year before her perpetrators were captured. He discussed how this single incident led to a complete evolution not only in his writing as a children's author, but also in his investment into culture, the direction of his philanthropy, and especially in his philosophy of life.

The Osborne case is a considered an influence on Tomson Highway's The Rez Sisters (1986). The character Zhaboonigan Peterson, a mentally challenged young woman, performs a monologue in which she describes being raped by two white men with a screwdriver (Osborne was stabbed 56 times with a screwdriver). Highway attended junior high school in The Pas and graduated a year before Osborne's rape and murder.

In 1991, a CBC TV miniseries about the Osborne kidnapping and murder was made, entitled Conspiracy of Silence.

In the book A Really Good Brown Girl by Marilyn Dumont, a Metis poet, a poem is named after Osborne.

See also
List of kidnappings
List of solved missing person cases

References

Sources

External links  

1952 births
1970s missing person cases
1971 deaths
1971 murders in Canada
Deaths by stabbing in Canada
Incidents of violence against women
Violence against Indigenous women in Canada
Women in Manitoba